Michael Moran (1893–1920) was an Irish murder victim.

Moran was a native of Carramoneen, Tuam, County Galway was shot dead in Galway while in the custody of the Royal Irish Constabulary.

He was commander of the IRA's Tuam battalion.  He was shot on 24 November 1920 by Auxiliaries, supposedly while attempting to flee police custody.

See also
 Jim Kirwan
 Frank Shawe-Taylor
 Michael Griffin (Irish priest)

References
 The History and Folklore of the Barony of Clare, Michael J. Hughes, c. 1993.

People from Tuam
1920 deaths
Deaths by firearm in Ireland
People from County Galway
Irish Republicans killed during the Irish War of Independence
People murdered in Ireland
Irish murder victims
Unsolved murders in Ireland
Police misconduct during the Irish War of Independence
1893 births
1920s murders in Ireland
1920 murders in Europe
1920 crimes in Ireland